Koye Feche is part of Addis Ababa and district of the Addis Ababa Akaki Kaliti sub city, Ethiopia, located in the Akaki kaliti sub city of  Addis Ababa , Ethiopia's capital Addis Ababa).

Protests
On 7 March 2019, Thousands of angry citizens took to the streets to protest in several cities and towns across the Oromia state such as Jimma, Ambo, Awaday, Bale Robe and Adama after Addis Ababa city administration allocated thousands of condominium buildings built by the city administration of Addis Ababa, located in Koye Fache to oromos and other Ethiopians.  
The intention of the protest was to reserve condominium houses to oromo ethinic groups specially Oromo officeals and to exclude other Ethiopians.  Oromia government opposed transferring houses that built within Oromia boundary. Several activists insisted that the housing units should be allotted to the uprooting local farmers where this view was also emphasised by the state government and its ruling party.

References

Cities and towns in Ethiopia